Joshua Beaver (born 1 March 1993) is an Australian swimmer who specialises in backstroke. He competed at the 2016 Summer Olympics in the 100 metre backstroke and the 200 metre backstroke. He finished 13th and 10th in the semifinals, respectively.

Beaver also competed in the 200 metre backstroke at the 2015 World Aquatics Championships in Kazan and is a Commonwealth Games medalist. Competing at the 2014 Commonwealth Games in Glasgow, he won silver in the 200m backstroke and  medley relay, and bronze in the 100m backstroke.

References

External links 
 
 
 
 

1993 births
Living people
Australian male backstroke swimmers
Olympic swimmers of Australia
Commonwealth Games silver medallists for Australia
Commonwealth Games bronze medallists for Australia
Commonwealth Games medallists in swimming
Swimmers at the 2014 Commonwealth Games
Swimmers at the 2016 Summer Olympics
Swimmers at the 2018 Commonwealth Games
21st-century Australian people
People from Dandenong, Victoria
Swimmers from Melbourne
Sportsmen from Victoria (Australia)
Medallists at the 2014 Commonwealth Games
Medallists at the 2018 Commonwealth Games